Vaira Paegle (July 6, 1942 – June 14, 2019) was a Latvian politician. She was a Deputy of the Saeima and a member of the People's Party, later of the Civic Union.

Biography 
Paegle was born in Riga, Latvia during the Nazi occupation. In 1944, she and her family left Latvia and spent the next seven years in Displaced Persons camps in the British Zone, Germany. In 1951, she and her family immigrated to the United States, living in Concord, New Hampshire.

Paegle graduated from Tufts University in 1964 with a Bachelor of Arts and received her master's degree from the University of New Hampshire. She married Viesturs Paegle in 1968 and the couple moved to Connecticut.

She became active in public service. Paegle worked for the Connecticut Department of Social Services until she retired in 1997. She was also the first woman president of the World Federation of Free Latvians.

She joined the People's Party in Latvia and began to run in Parliamentary elections. Paegle served for three terms and was elected Chair of the Foreign Relations Committee and later the Chair of the European Affairs Committee. Paegle also founded the Women's Caucus in the Latvian Parliament. In 1998, she was a candidate for the People's Party in the Latvian elections.

She joined the People's Party in Latvia and began to run in Parliamentary elections. Paegle served for three terms and was elected Chair of the Foreign Relations Committee and later the Chair of the European Affairs Committee. Paegle also founded the Women's Caucus in the Latvian Parliament. In 1998, she was a candidate for the People's Party in the Latvian elections.

References

1942 births
2019 deaths
Politicians from Riga
People's Party (Latvia) politicians
Civic Union (Latvia) politicians
Deputies of the 7th Saeima
Deputies of the 8th Saeima
Deputies of the 9th Saeima
Candidates for President of Latvia
Women deputies of the Saeima
20th-century Latvian women politicians
21st-century Latvian women politicians
Latvian World War II refugees
Latvian emigrants to the United States